Rohrdorf is a municipality of the district of Calw in Baden-Württemberg, Germany.

History
Rohrdorf was ceded in 1303 in commendam by the County of Hohenberg to the Knights Hospitaller, who established a Commandery in the village that existed until 1806. Control of the town via patronage was a contest between the County of Württemberg and the Electoral Palatinate that began in 1363. Württemberg triumphed when in 1440 it purchased Wildberg from the Electoral Palatinate. Between 1363 and 1440, Rohrdorf was ruled by the House of Wöllhausen as vogts for the House of Württemberg. In 1738, the Duchy of Württemberg sold some of its rights over Rohrdorf and did not regain them until 1805. Rohrdorf began a period of urban growth after World War II, expanding to north, east, and south. There was further development in the 1970s that added the Kämmerle industrial district.

Geography
The municipality (Gemeinde) of Rohrdorf is situated in the district of Calw, in Baden-Württemberg, one of the 16 States of the Federal Republic of Germany. Elevation above sea level in the municipal area ranges from a high of  Normalnull (NN) to a low of  NN.

A portion of the Federally protected  nature reserve is located in Rohrdorf's municipal area.

Culture
The Knights Hospitaller built the Church of Saint John and two palaces in Rohrdorf over the 15th and 16th centuries.

Politics
Rohrdorf has a single borough (Ortsteil), Rohrdorf, and the industrial district of Kämmerle. The municipality has been cited by the government of Baden-Württemberg as one of ten model municipalities in regard to rural development.

Coat of arms
The coat of arms of Rohrdorf is divided party per fess into an upper, red section and a lower, white section. A white Maltese cross is housed in the upper field. The tincture is taken from the arms of the House of Hohenberg, and the Maltese cross from the Knights Hospitaller. This coat of arms first saw in use since 1913 but was not adopted officially until 1956.

Transportation
Rohrdorf is connected to Germany's network of roadways by Bundesstraße 28.

References

External links

  (in German)

Calw (district)